Richard "Rick" Crouch (born 6 September 1960) is a former South African politician and City Councillor in the eThekwini Metropolitan Municipality representing the official opposition Democratic Alliance. Aside from being a former politician Crouch is a private investigator and a qualified commercial pilot.

Education
Crouch matriculated from Mansfield High School in 1979. 

There were three attempts on Crouch's life after which he decided to seek sanctuary in the United States.

Career

As a politician in South Africa

In 1980, at the age of 19, Crouch became a member of the Progressive Party, one of the two opposition parties represented in parliament at the time. From the period 1982, until he was forced into self-exile in the United States.

Crouch, along with his family, decided in 2005 that he would return to South Africa to pick up where he left off in 1986 and run for public office. Upon his return to South Africa, Crouch was elected to the Chairmanship of the eThekwini Ward 10 Branch of the Democratic Alliance.

During his time as chairman Crouch has been actively involved in the community and in Ward 10. Crouch also served on the Executive Committee of the Hillcrest Community Policing Forum (CPF).

On 22 May 2010, Crouch was elected as a City Councilor to the Durban City Council representing the residents of Ward 99 for the Democratic Alliance in the ANC majority Council.

In May 2011, Crouch was re-elected to the Durban City Council with an 83.87% majority, this time as a Ward Councillor representing the residents of Ward 10, which includes the suburbs of Gillitts, Hillcrest, Winston Park and Kloof.

In December 2012, Crouch was elected Councillor of the Year for 2012 by his colleagues.

In the aftermath of one of the most horrific accidents in Durban, the 2013 Pinetown crash, Crouch has been vocal about the Provincial Government's failure in stopping the carnage on Fields Hill, going as far as accusing the KwaZulu-Natal MEC of Transport, Community Safety and Liaison, Willies Mchunu, of practicing tombstone legislation. Crouch has been campaigning for stricter rules for trucks on Fields Hill.

On 4 February 2018, Crouch resigned his council seat in order to concentrate more on his expanding private investigation business and to spend more time with his family.

As an investigator in the United States

As well as becoming a commercial pilot while in the United States, Crouch formed a private investigation and digital forensics company. Through his work with celebrities and their high-profile attorneys, Crouch became known as "PI to the stars".

Some of the celebrities Crouch worked for through their attorneys are; musician Michael Jackson, actress Winona Ryder, musician Chris Brown, and the wife of Fred Astaire, Robyn, to name a few.

He also assisted local law enforcement and the FBI in locating and returning fugitives to justice. Crouch and his company also worked as bounty hunters, tracking down fugitives who had decided to "jump bail" and fled the jurisdiction.

Crouch authored and published a training manual and reference guide titled Bail Investigator Training Manual (Become a bounty hunter now) for investigators interested in or currently in the field of Bail Enforcement (Bounty Hunting).

As an investigator in South Africa

In South Africa Crouch has formed a private investigation and digital forensics company Rick Crouch & Associates where he holds the position of Managing Director.

Crouch has been described in local media as having a "Chuck Norris-like past".

Publications
 Bail Investigator Training Manual (Become a bounty hunter now)

References

External links
 
 Councillor Site
 Rick Crouch & Associates
 Who's Who in Southern Africa

|-

1960 births
Bounty hunters
Commercial aviators
Democratic Alliance (South Africa) politicians
Digital forensics people
Living people
People from Durban
People from KwaZulu-Natal
People from Orange County, California
Politicians from Los Angeles
Private detectives and investigators
Progressive Party (South Africa) politicians
South African businesspeople
South African chief executives
South African people of British descent
White South African anti-apartheid activists